Lady (Ann) Caroline Faber (29 August 1923 – 14 September 2016) was the daughter of Harold Macmillan (created Earl of Stockton in 1984) and his wife, Lady Dorothy Macmillan. She was the second of their four children, and their last surviving child.

Caroline Macmillan was born in 1923. She attended West Heath Girls' School, where she was offered a place to study medicine at Oxford. She declined the offer and served as an ambulance driver in World War II, during which time she met her future husband, insurance executive Julian Faber, who was an officer in the Welsh Guards.

They were married from 1944 until his death in January 2002 and had five children.

 Anne Christine Adriane Faber (1944 – 28 November 2002). Married 1970 (div 1981) Michael Roger Lewis Cockerell (b. 1940), British broadcaster and journalist; issue 1 son and 1 daughter. She married secondly 1995 Hon. David Sidney Bernstein, son of Sidney Lewis Bernstein, Baron Bernstein, by whom she had no further issue.
 Michael David Tufnell Faber (born 1945). Married Catherine Suzanne de Braine, and has issue.
 Mark James Julian Faber (1950–1991), a Sussex cricketer. Married Ann Griffith, and has issue.
 David James Christian Faber (born 1961), Conservative politician and a former MCC Committee member.
 James Edwin Charles Faber (born 1964).

The family lived at Birch Grove, the Macmillan home in East Sussex.

Caroline supported the political campaigns of her family members, including her brother Maurice and son David, and carried out charity work for the National Blind Children’s Society.

She died in Sussex on 14 September 2016 at the age of 93, and her funeral was held at Chelsea Old Church, Cheyne Walk, London later that month.

Arms

Notes

1923 births
2016 deaths
English people of American descent
English people of Scottish descent
Daughters of British earls
Children of prime ministers of the United Kingdom
Caroline
Caroline
British women in World War II